The Baishazhou Yangtze River Bridge, sometimes referred as the Third Wuhan Yangtze River Bridge for being the third Yangtze river bridge in Wuhan, is a highway bridge over the Yangtze River in Wuhan, Hubei Province, China. The two bridge names come from the order of construction (it was built after the First and Second Bridges), and from the name of the small island (Baisha Zhou, i.e. "White Sand Island") located under the bridge.

The bridge construction started in 1997 and was completed in September 2000.
The final construction cost of the bridge was $380 million. The bridge serves as a major passage for the Third Ring Road enormously easing the city's traffic and aiding local economic development.

See also
 Yangtze River bridges and tunnels
 List of largest cable-stayed bridges

References

Bridges in Wuhan
Bridges over the Yangtze River
Bridges completed in 2000
Cable-stayed bridges in China
2000 establishments in China